John Helm Grim (August 9, 1867 – July 28, 1961) was an American catcher in Major League Baseball (MLB). He played 11 seasons in the majors from 1888 to 1899.

Career
Grim was born in Lebanon, Kentucky. Although he played in two games for the 1888 Philadelphia Quakers, his MLB career really started when he joined the Rochester Broncos of the American Association in 1890. Grim played sparingly for the Broncos and the Milwaukee Brewers in 1891. It wasn't until he joined the Louisville Colonels in 1892 that he became the starting catcher.

Grim played three seasons for Louisville, enjoying his best season in 1894 when he batted .299 with 7 home runs and 71 runs batted in. He played his final five seasons for the Brooklyn Grooms/Bridegrooms/Superbas with moderate success. In his 11-year career, Grim batted .267, hit 16 home runs, and drove in 332 runs. He also pitched one game and umpired three games.

Grim died in Indianapolis, Indiana, at the age of 93 and was interred at Crown Hill Cemetery.

References

1867 births
1961 deaths
19th-century baseball players
Major League Baseball catchers
Milwaukee Brewers (AA) players
Philadelphia Quakers players
Rochester Broncos players
Louisville Colonels players
Brooklyn Grooms players
Brooklyn Bridegrooms players
Brooklyn Superbas players
Danville Browns players
Lima Lushers players
Toronto Canucks players
Milwaukee Brewers (minor league) players
St. Joseph Saints players
Minneapolis Millers (baseball) players
Baseball players from Kentucky
People from Lebanon, Kentucky
Burials at Crown Hill Cemetery
Marion Oilworkers players